Racinaea parviflora is a plant species in the genus Racinaea. This species is native to Bolivia and Ecuador.

References

parviflora
Flora of Bolivia
Flora of Ecuador